The Silver River, aka the Big Silver River and Big Silver Creek, or zácta in the St'at'imcets language of the In-SHUCK-ch people, is the second-largest stream entering Harrison Lake in the Lower Mainland of British Columbia, Canada (the largest is the Lillooet River, at the head of the lake).  Rising in the central Lillooet Ranges to the east of the lake, it is approximately 40 km in length; its main tributary is the Little Silver River.  A logging camp at its mouth was once a thriving community named Silver River.

References

Rivers of the Pacific Ranges
Rivers of the Lower Mainland
Lillooet Ranges